The men's 10 metre air rifle competition at the 2004 Summer Olympics was held on 16 August at the Markópoulo Olympic Shooting Centre near Athens, Greece.

The event consisted of two rounds: a qualifier and a final. In the qualifier, each shooter fired 60 shots with an air rifle at 10 metres distance from the standing position. Scores for each shot were in increments of 1, with a maximum score of 10. 

The top 8 shooters in the qualifying round moved on to the final round. There, they fired an additional 10 shots. These shots scored in increments of .1, with a maximum score of 10.9. The total score from all 70 shots was used to determine final ranking.

China's Zhu Qinan stunned the entire worldwide audience as he came from nowhere to snatch the Olympic gold in air rifle shooting, smashing a new world record of 702.7 points. Zhu also enjoyed his teammate Li Jie taking home the silver medal with 702.7, as the Chinese marksmen led the medal haul in a blistering 1–2 finish. Slovakia's world number one Jozef Gönci came up with a steady feat in the final to claim the bronze on 697.4 points. Earlier in the prelims, Zhu set a junior world standard to grab the top seed in the six-man final, just one point short of the perfect grade 600 that had been successfully recorded by Thailand's Tevarit Majchacheeap in 2000.

Records
Prior to this competition, the existing world and Olympic records were as follows.

Qualification round

Final

References

External links
Official Results

Men's 10 m Air Rifle
Men's events at the 2004 Summer Olympics